Jaan Mark (born 11 June 1951) is an Estonian politician. He is a member of the Estonian Reform Party. 2005–2006 he served as the governor of Harju County.

References

1951 births
Living people
Estonian Reform Party politicians